Tibetan Peach Pie: A True Account of an Imaginative Life is a self-declared "un-memoir" by Tom Robbins.

It is written in his characteristically imaginative style, and has received generally positive reviews.

References

External links

2014 American novels
Books by Tom Robbins
American memoirs
Ecco Press books